Cordice is a surname. Notable people with the surname include:

John W. V. Cordice (1919–2014), American doctor and surgeon
Neil Cordice (born 1960), English footballer
Louis Cordice, a cast member in the Harry Potter film series